WA4 may refer to:
 Washington's 4th congressional district
 Washington State Route 4
 Wild Arms 4, a role-playing video game
 WA4, a postcode district in Warrington, England; see WA postcode area